The 1957 Cincinnati Bearcats football team represented the University of Cincinnati in the Missouri Valley Conference during the 1957 NCAA University Division football season. The team was led by head coach George Blackburn.

Schedule

References

Cincinnati
Cincinnati Bearcats football seasons
Cincinnati Bearcats football